"Never Be a Right Time" is a song by British rapper Professor Green which features uncredited vocals from British singer/songwriter Ed Drewett. The track serves as the second single from Professor Green's second studio album, At Your Inconvenience and was released as a digital download in the United Kingdom on 22 January 2012.

Music video
A music video to accompany the release of "Never Be a Right Time" was first released onto YouTube on 24 November 2011 at a total length of three minutes and twenty seconds. The video was filmed on the streets of East London.

Track listing

Chart performance

Release history

References

2011 songs
2012 singles
Professor Green songs
Contemporary R&B ballads
Songs written by Professor Green
Virgin Records singles